Little Children is the original soundtrack, on the New Line Records label, of the 2006 Academy Award- and Golden Globe-nominated film Little Children starring Kate Winslet, Patrick Wilson, Jennifer Connelly, Phyllis Somerville and Jackie Earle Haley. The original score was composed by Thomas Newman.

Track listing 

Drama film soundtracks
2006 soundtrack albums
New Line Records soundtracks